Alderley Edge is a village and civil parish in Cheshire, England. In 2011, it had a population of 4,780.

Alderley Edge is known for its affluence and expensive houses, falling inside Cheshire's Golden Triangle. Alderley Edge has a selection of cafes and designer shops and has attracted numerous Premier League footballers, actors and multi-millionaire businesspeople. It is one of the most expensive and sought-after places to live in the UK outside London.

History

The area around Alderley Edge provides proof of occupation since the Mesolithic period with flint implements being found along the line of the sandstone outcrop. Evidence of copper mining in the Bronze Age has also been found to the south of the area. In 1995 members of the Derbyshire Caving Club found a hoard of 564 coins of the Roman Empire (now in the Manchester Museum) dating from AD 317 to AD 336. There are to date 13 recorded sites on the County Sites and Monuments Record (CSMR) in the settled area of Alderley Edge and 28 in Nether Alderley, with a further 44 along the Edge.

Early medieval settlements are recorded at Nether Alderley, to the south of Alderley Edge. The first written evidence of Alderley Edge, known then as 'Chorlegh' (later spelt as 'Chorley') appeared in the 13th century, the likely derivation being from ceorl and lēah, meaning a peasants' clearing. Although not mentioned in the Domesday Book, it is included in a charter of c.1280. The name 'Alderley' first appears in 1086 as 'Aldredelie'. Several versions of the origin are known: one says it originated from Aldred and leah meaning 'Aldred's Clearing'. Another says it is most likely that the name Alderley came from Old English language 'Alðrȳðelēah' meaning "the meadow or woodland clearing of a woman called Alðrȳð.

In the 13th century and during the Middle Ages, the area comprised estates that had many owners. Since the 15th century, most of them have belonged to the De Trafford baronets. The principal manors were based on the 14th century Chorley Old Hall, which is south-west of Alderley Edge, and the Old Hall, at Nether Alderley, a 16th-century building burnt down in 1779. The economies of Chorley and Nether Alderley were dominated by agriculture with a market charter granted at Nether Alderley in c.1253. Nether Alderley Mill dates back to 1391, although the present timber structure is 16th century. The millpond was adapted to form the moat, which surrounded the Old Hall, the home of the Stanley family. The corn mill continued to be worked until 1939 when Edward Stanley, 6th Baron Stanley of Alderley, was compelled to sell it, along with the rest of the Alderley Park estate, to meet the cost of death duties. In the 1950s the National Trust bought the site and has since restored the building and opened it to the public.

Cheshire had its own system of taxes in the mediaeval period, the Mize, and in the records for 1405 Chorley was assessed at 20s 0d and Nether Alderley at 27s 0d.

Lead and copper mining on the Edge is documented from the late 17th century to the 20th century. After the destruction of the Old Hall in the late 18th century, the Stanley family moved to Park House on the south edge of Alderley Park, and house and park were afterwards much extended. Throughout the 19th century Nether Alderley remained under the control of the Stanleys and the lack of development pressure meant that the dispersed medieval settlement pattern was retained. In 1830 Chorley consisted of only a few cottages, the De Trafford Arms Inn, a toll bar, and a smithy, straggling along the Congleton to Manchester Road.

The coming of the railway in 1842 with the construction of the Stockport to Crewe section of the main Manchester and Birmingham Railway changed all this. The Manchester and Birmingham Railway Company built the line through Chorley, offering free season tickets for 20 years to Manchester businessmen who built houses with a rateable value of more than £50 within a mile of the station. This 'season ticket' was in the form of a small silver oval which could be worn on a watch chain.

The railway also gave Alderley Edge its current name. As the railway network expanded and travel became easier, the railway company did not want its station called Chorley because of the possible confusion with Chorley in Lancashire. So, in 1880 they renamed it Alderley Edge railway station, against much opposition, taking the old name for the village and the name of the sandstone escarpment already known as The Edge. The name Chorley, Macclesfield is retained by the civil parish to the northwest of Alderley Edge.

Following the construction of the railway, the local landowner, Sir Humphrey de Trafford, of Chorley Hall, laid out an extensive estate of new roads and new houses were incrementally added, filling in most of the available sites by 1910. Of these, nine are now listed grade II. The area boundary largely reflects de Trafford's original estate boundaries. Also because of the railway, Alderley became a popular place to visit and the railway company popularised day trips and cheap excursions to the village.

This period also saw the appearance of buildings which are now landmarks. St Philip's Church, Alderley Edge, with its  spire, was built in 1853 and the village primary school a year later known as Alderley Edge Community Primary School. Two all-girls schools were opened, St Hilary's in 1876 and Mount Carmel in 1945, which then merged in 1999 to form Alderley Edge School for Girls. A boys' school, The Ryleys School, was opened in 1877. The Mission Hall (later known as The Institute) was built as a temperance hall for the recreation of the 'lower classes' by the wealthier residents in 1878. The Methodist Church in Chapel Road was built ten years after St Philip's.

The area is notable for its heavily wooded streets and substantial Victorian villas set in spacious gardens. The first villa was constructed in the early 1840s and by 1850 thirty "handsome residences" had been erected, some of them in what is now the Alderley Edge Conservation Area. Cotton barons from Manchester built their mansions here and now (as at around 2010) they are changing hands for several million pounds. The village winds up a high street with many restaurants, designer shops and speciality food shops. Around the village, winding lanes are covered in their original sandstone setts and front boundary walls are usually built from the same local sandstone. The buildings are varied in style with examples of mock Tudor, Italian, neo-Georgian and Arts and Crafts Movement designs. The wide range of materials used reflects this somewhat eclectic mix of styles, and includes stone, brick (several colours), smooth render or roughcast for the walls, and Welsh slate or clay tiles for the roofs.

The growth of Alderley Edge is recorded in the census returns, with the population rising from 561 in 1841 to 2856 in 1902 (the return for Nether Alderley shows a drop from 679 to 522 within the same period). There was no church in Chorley until 1852, when the larger expansion of the town in the demanded enlarged accommodation, but St Mary's Church, Nether Alderley, retains some 14th century work including a font.

The First Edition Ordnance Survey map of 1871 therefore shows "Chorley" (as it still was) with the new Queen's Hotel next to the station, new shops and terraced houses along London Road, and a Post Office at the town centre, where Macclesfield Road meets Alderley Road. To the north are wooded areas with detached villas, but to the east is a much larger area, roughly approximating to the modern conservation area, where curving roads divide generous wooded plots, usually with its own house, although some plots remained undeveloped until much later. Of interest is the use of the names "Brickfield" and "Brick kiln" on a site to the north-east of Alderley Edge, suggesting a source for the local bricks.

The 1899 map shows a similar footprint but it is much easier to make out the individual villas and their names – Holybank, Ashfield (Alderley Edge villa), The Larches, etc. Also very evident on this map are the remains of the old mines towards and within Windmill Wood, immediately to the southeast. In the 20th century, Alderley Edge continued to expand with much post-war housing around the northeastern and western edges. Nether Alderley has remained relatively unchanged, apart from the sale of Alderley Park to Astra Zeneca (previously ICI, Imperial Chemical Industries). Astra Zeneca has since sold Alderley Park to Manchester-based, family-owned property company Bruntwood. The park is now home to 150 science companies and is the UK's largest single-site life-science facility along with commercial workspace, residential and retail spaces.

Administrative history

From medieval times the area was part of the Chorley township of the ancient parish of Wilmslow in the Macclesfield Hundred of Cheshire. Under the Poor Law Amendment Act 1866 Chorley became a civil parish in its own right. Alderley Edge civil parish was created on 31 December 1894 from part of Chorley civil parish. Along with Bollinfee civil parish it formed Alderley Edge Urban District. In 1974 it became a civil parish in the new non-metropolitan district of Macclesfield. Since 1 April 2009 it has been part of the unitary authority of Cheshire East.

Boundary changes
The civil parish was enlarged on 30 September by gaining a further part of Chorley. On 1 October 1910 it was enlarged by gaining part of Nether Alderley civil parish.

Economy
At the 2001 UK census, the Alderley Edge ward had a possible workforce of approximately 2157 people. The economic activity of residents in the Alderley Edge electoral ward was 36.9% in full-time employment, 10.2% in part-time employment, 29.3% self-employed, 1.7% unemployed, 1.4% students with jobs, 3.5% students without jobs, 19.3% retired, 7.5% looking after home or family, 2.8% permanently sick or disabled and 2.0% economically inactive for other reasons. Alderley Edge has a very high rate of self-employment (29.3%) compared with rest of the Macclesfield borough (22.7%) and England (16.6%). Alderley Edge also has low rates of unemployment (1.7%) compared with the rest of the Macclesfield borough (2.0%) and England (3.3%). The Office for National Statistics estimated that during the period of April 2001 to March 2002 the average gross weekly income of households in Alderley Edge was £720 (£37,440 per year).

Notable residents
After the death of their father in 1870, George Gissing and his two younger brothers were sent to Lindow Grove, a quaker boarding school in Alderley Edge, whose headmaster James Wood was often parodied by the novelist.

The Pilkington family (of Pilkington's Glass) owned all of the woodland now known as The Edge until 1948, when their daughters donated the land to the National Trust. The Pilkington company developed the toughened safety glass necessary when motor cars and very tall buildings became popular. They became hugely wealthy. On Woodbrook Road they built The Cedars as the family home, which has a distinctive large tower and is built from white stone. (The house is now sub-divided into four luxury dwellings.)

The author Alan Garner, who wrote the children's fantasy novel The Weirdstone of Brisingamen, which is set on Alderley Edge, lived on Trafford Road, Alderley Edge.

Footballers who live in Alderley Edge include Joleon Lescott and Manchester United players Dwight Yorke, Rio Ferdinand, Michael Carrick, and Andy Cole. David Beckham and his wife Victoria Beckham previously resided in Alderley Edge. A number of Coronation Street actors, including Helen Flanagan, Denise Welch and Richard Fleeshman, also live in the village. Additionally musicians Bernard Sumner and Peter Hook both live in the village.

Landmarks

The Edge

The Edge is a wide red sandstone escarpment situated above the village of Alderley. An edge is used as a descriptive term for high land in Cheshire and adjacent counties, such as in Wenlock Edge and Blackstone Edge. The Edge at Alderley is a ridge of land separating a narrow and short valley from the higher ground of southeast Cheshire and Derbyshire. It rises gradually from the town of Macclesfield, until, at a distance of 7 or 8 kilometres, it terminates abruptly, having reached a height of nearly 215 metres above sea level, and 110 metres above the Cheshire Plain below it.

It was formed partly by the weathering of resistant sandstone lying on top of a softer sandstone, and partly by faulting of the rocks. The scarp or slope is repeated eight times by faults of up to 200 metres, which has thrown down blocks of sandstone west to Alderley and east to the village of Kirkleyditch. The northern side of the Edge is shaped like a horse shoe or hough (pronounced huff), as this type of ridge is called in Cheshire. The Edge also marks the line of a hamlet of scattered houses called The Hough, which descend towards Alderley village.

The Edge is owned by the National Trust. It is maintained as a public access wooded area and is a popular destination for day trippers from Manchester and the nearby towns of Wilmslow and Macclesfield, attracting 300,000 visitors a year. There is a car park with toilet facilities. The Edge has been designated a Site of Special Scientific Interest for its unique geology. Its woodland area is riddled with the old Alderley Edge Mines.

Views

From its highest point, the Edge affords panoramic views across Cheshire and the Peak District and walking paths through the property, as well as one to nearby National Trust property Hare Hill. From the Edge, the Cheshire Plain, can be seen extending from the area of Macclesfield Forest on the south east side with its undulating land and woods, towards the extreme easterly point of the Derbyshire peaks, and northerly to Manchester and Blackstone Edge in Yorkshire.

Until trees were planted at the Edge (1745–1755), visitors to the Edge could see a full 360° panorama of the country around; today the view from the Edge itself is limited to the northerly and easterly directions. Trees now obscure the views in other directions, including views of the Wrekin in Shropshire to the south; The Cloud near Bosley and Mow Cop (where the Cheshire Plain meets the Peckforton Hills, Beeston Castle, and the Delamere Forest) to the southwest; and west to the mountains of North Wales.

History
The Edge was described as a dreary common 
till the year 1779, when it was enclosed together with all the other waste lands of Alderley. Some hundreds of Scots pines were planted on the highest points by Sir James and Sir Edward Stanley, between 1745 and 1755; before that time, it does not appear that a single tree grew on it.

In 1882, George Ormerod in his book The History of Cheshire described the Edge as "an abrupt and elevated ridge, formerly the site of a Beacon, which bears the appearance of having been detached by some great convulsion of nature from the range of the Macclesfield hills, as Helsby and Beeston seem to have been from those of Delamere and Peckforton. Near the summit, "cobalt ore, lead, and copper have been got in small quantities. The sides are varied with cultivated land, wood, and rock; and the entire mass presents a striking object to all the surrounding district, over which it commands a most extensive prospect."

Alderley Edge mines

The escarpment in Alderley Edge has long been a site of copper mining. Archaeological evidence indicates that mining took place here during Roman times and the Bronze Age, and written records show that mining continued here from the 1690s up to the 1920s. Many of the mines are owned by the National Trust and have been leased from them by the Derbyshire Caving Club which maintains access and continues to explore and search for areas of mining that have been closed for centuries.

From the 1860s onwards, there have been many thousands of visitors to the mines. However, many other visitors, especially between 1940 and 1960, were ill-equipped and unprepared. This led to a series of accidents that gained the mines a notoriety which still haunts them today. The West and Wood Mines were finally blocked in the early 1960s (Jones, 1961). In 1969, the Derbyshire Caving Club obtained permission from the National Trust (the owners) to re-open Wood Mine and since then much has been found by excavation and exploration and thousands of people have visited the mines in supervised groups.

Historic buildings

There are many historic buildings including Chorley Old Hall, which is the oldest surviving manor house in Cheshire.

To the south of the village is the Alderley Park estate, former ancestral home of the Stanleys.

Local legends

There are several local legends, the most famous being that of the Wizard of the Edge.

The Wizard of the Edge
Legend has it that a farmer from Mobberley was taking a milk white mare to sell at the market in Macclesfield. Walking along the Edge, he reached a spot known locally as "Thieves Hole" where an old man clad in a grey and flowing garment stopped him. The old man offered the farmer a sum of money for his horse but the farmer refused, saying he could get a better price at the market. The old man told the farmer that he would be at this spot again that evening when the farmer returned, not having found a purchaser for the horse. So the farmer went to market; but having failed to sell the horse, returned in the evening and made his journey back along the Edge. At the same point, the old man appeared again, repeating his offer, which this time was accepted. The old man told the farmer to follow him with the horse. As they approached an area just past Stormy Point, the old man held out a wand and uttered a spell, opening the rock revealing a pair of huge iron gates, which the wizard – as he was – opened. Assuring no harm the wizard told the farmer to enter. The farmer did so, and was led through the gates into a large cavern. In the cavern, the farmer saw countless men and white horses, all asleep. In a recess there was a chest, from which the wizard took the payment for the horse, which he gave to the farmer. The astonished farmer asked what all this meant; the wizard explained that all these sleeping warriors were ready to awake and fight should England fall into danger. He then ordered the farmer to leave and return home.

There are several versions of the legend. It first appeared in print when a letter, sent by someone using the pseudonym "A Perambulator", was published in the Manchester Mail in 1805. "A Perambulator" wrote in his letter that the story had been related to him by an old servant of the Stanley family of Alderley, and it used to be told by Parson Shrigley, former Clerk and Curate of Alderley (who was in the post from 1753 until his death in 1776 and is buried in Alderley Church). It subsequently appeared in expanded form in a tourist pamphlet, in both prose and verse forms, the former under the title The Cheshire Enchanter and the latter The Legend of the Iron Gates. Several versions include parts of prophecies made by Robert Nixon in the wizard's explanation to the farmer, such as "There will come a day when these men and these horses, awakening from their enchanted slumber, will descend into the plain, decide the fate of a great battle, and save their country. This shall be when George the son of George shall reign." Some later variations, such as a poem by James Roscoe, say that the Wizard was Merlin and the sleeping men were King Arthur and his army.

Similar legends
There are a number of similar British legends which closely resemble the Alderley one, though since they are all founded in oral tradition it is not possible to know which came first. In one, set in the Eildon Hills in Scotland and narrated by Sir Walter Scott, the old man is named as Thomas of Erceldoune and the horses are black. Once in the cave, the old man asks the farmer to choose between a sword and a horn. The farmer chooses the horn, and immediately the horses all jump up and start to stamp their hooves on the ground. The terrified farmer is expelled from the cave by a whirlwind and hears the words "Woe is the coward that ever was born, that did not draw the sword but blew the horn". Another very similar one was made into a ballad called Sir Guy the Seeker by Matthew 'Monk' Lewis, and is based on a legend of Dunstanburgh Castle. In his preface to Sir Guy the Seeker Lewis pointed out the similarity to the Alderley legend.

Alan Garner used the legend of The Wizard of the Edge, and other local legends, in his novels The Weirdstone of Brisingamen and The Moon of Gomrath. Garner, born in Congleton, was raised in Alderley Edge.

Gold and coins
Several ancient gold bars have been found at Alderley Edge, the first on Artists Lane. It was declared treasure trove, and an inquest was held in Congleton on 26 February 1993. John Cherry from the British Museum along with Adrian Tindall, the Principal Conservation Officer (Archaeology) for Cheshire County Council, reported that the gold bar weighed 97.01 grams and was determined to be 73% gold. The publicity caused the public to search for more, and indeed five more gold bars were found.

Members of the Derbyshire Caving Club found a Roman coin hoard in 1995; the hoard contained 564 coins from AD 317–36.

Transport

Bypass

After several decades of discussion, a 5 km, north-to-south A34 Alderley Edge bypass was constructed (officially named Melrose Way) to the west of Alderley Edge to reduce traffic flow through the centre of village. It starts at the Harden roundabout at the south end of the existing Wilmslow bypass and goes west of Alderley Edge and rejoins the A34 at the bend about 400 yards north of the south gate of Astra Zeneca's laboratory grounds. The bypass was constructed to relieve the congestion caused by the 26,000 vehicles that previously passed through Alderley Edge daily. The project cost £56 million and the main civil engineering works were contracted to Birse Civils. The bypass was officially opened by the Chancellor of the Exchequer and MP for Alderley Edge, George Osborne, on Friday, 19 November 2010,  "over 6 months before schedule" according to a notice that contractors put up at its south end.

Railway
Alderley Edge railway station is situated on the Crewe to Manchester line and each hour has two trains to Crewe, two to Manchester Piccadilly via Stockport and one to Manchester Piccadilly via Manchester Airport.

Buses
Alderley Edge is served by a Bus Route known as the 130 By D&G Buses, in one direction it heads towards Macclesfield while in the other direction it heads towards Wilmslow & Manchester Airport (Information to be confirmed please if Bus is still running)

In popular culture
The village has been used as a major setting in various books and television shows:
The village was the main setting of the Channel 4 show Goldplated
The location inspired Peter Graham to compose "On Alderley Edge", a commission for the Black Dyke Band.
The village was the main setting of the MTV show Living on the Edge
The Edge and the country south of it was the setting for Alan Garner's novels The Weirdstone of Brisingamen and The Moon of Gomrath.
The village has been featured in the ITVBe show The Real Housewives of Cheshire.

See also

Listed buildings in Alderley Edge
Geology of Alderley Edge
Macclesfield group power stations

Notes

References
Anon, 1696. Concerning Rioting at Copper Mines in Over Alderley. Abstracts of Knutsford Quarter Session Records. pp. 195–197
Anon, 1808. Indenture between (1) Ashton, (2) Bury and Dodge and (3) Jarrold. AELP Archive
Anon, 1911. Alderley Edge Copper Mines – work commenced. Alderley and Wilmslow Advertiser, 17 February 1911
Bakewell, R., 1811. Account of a Cobalt Mine in Cheshire. Monthly Magazine No. 209 Vol. 31. pp. 7–9
Bentley Smith, D., 2005. A Georgian Gent & Co. – The Life and Times of Charles Roe. Ashbourne: Landmark Publishing 
Boyd Dawkins, W., 1876. On the Stone Mining Tools from Alderley Edge. Jour. Anthro. Inst. GB and Ireland. 5, pp. 3–5
Broadhurst, F.M. et al., 1970. The Area Around Manchester: Geologists Association Guide No 7
Carlon, Chris J., 1979. The Alderley Edge Mines, Altrincham: John Sherratt and Son Ltd. 
Carlon, Chris J. and Dibben, Nigel J., 2012. The Alderley Edge Mines, Nantwich: Nigel Dibben 
Cheshire County Council Records Office
Garner, A., Prag, J., Housley, R., 1994. The Alderley Edge Shovel, An Epic in three Acts. Current Archaeology. (137) pp. 172–175
Jones, W.F., 1961. "The Copper Mines of Alderley Edge". Privately Published (copy in Manchester Central Library)
Rail in Cheshire: Documents in the National Railway Museum York, United Kingdom
Roeder C., 1902. Prehistoric and Subsequent Mining at Alderley Edge etc.. Trans. Lancs. and Ches. Antiqn. Soc. Vol. 19, pp. 77–136
Roeder, C. and Graves, F.S., 1905. Recent Archaeological Discoveries at Alderley Edge. Trans. Lancs. and Ches. Antiqn. Soc. Vol. 23, pp. 17–29
Stanley, Louisa D., 1843. Alderley Edge and its Neighbourhood. Originally published by Swinnerton, reprinted by E J Morten, 2nd Ed., 1969. Manchester, United Kingdom: E.J. Morten
Timberlake, S. & Prag, A.J.N.W., 2005. The Archaeology of Alderley Edge, Oxford: John and Erica Hedges Ltd  
Warrington, G., 1981. The Copper Mines of Alderley Edge and Mottram St Andrew, Cheshire. Jour. Chester Arch. Soc. 64, pp. 47–73

External links

Alderley Edge Parish Council
alderleyedge.com
Alderley Edge information at the National Trust

Hills of Cheshire
Locations associated with Arthurian legend
National Trust properties in Cheshire
Villages in Cheshire
Civil parishes in Cheshire
Sites of Special Scientific Interest in Cheshire
Borough of Cheshire East